Vaishnava Jana To is a Hindu bhajan, written in the 15th century by the poet Narsinh Mehta in the Gujarati language. The poem speaks about the traits and the ideals of a Vaishnava jana (a follower of Vaishnavism).

Influence
This devotional hymn became popular during the life time of Mahatma Gandhi and was rendered as a bhajan in his Sabarmati Ashram by vocalists and instrumentalists like Gotuvadyam Narayana Iyengar. It was popular among freedom fighters throughout India. It embodies the philosophy of the poet, Narsinh Mehta. According to the scholar Vasudha Narayanan, this poem is a traditional example of the concept of jiva-daya, a form of ahimsa that comprises experiencing the pain of others and associating it with bhakti, which is devotion to God.

Lyrics

See also
 Raghupati Raghava Raja Ram
 Hari Tuma Haro

References

Vaishnavism
Bhajan
Hindu music
Indian poems
Cultural depictions of Mahatma Gandhi
Gujarati-language songs
Gujarati-language poems
Hindu devotional songs